This is a complete family tree of the Kings of Naples.

 

Naples, Kings of